Éamonn Breen (born 1969/1970) is a former Gaelic footballer from County Kerry. He was an All-Ireland medal and an All Star while playing at senior level for the Kerry county team in 1997. He also won an Under 21 All-Ireland in 1990. He played his club football for Finuge with which he won County Junior Championship Medals in 2002 and 2004. He added Munster medals in both those years and an All-Ireland in 2005.

He retired from inter-county football in mid-1999 and was reported to have departed for the United States. According to his father, Eddie, the decisive factor was the departure of a friend, Liam Flaherty, from the Kerry panel earlier that week.

References

Year of birth missing (living people)
Living people
All Stars Awards winners (football)
Fingue Gaelic footballers
Kerry inter-county Gaelic footballers
Winners of one All-Ireland medal (Gaelic football)